Takeichi (written: 竹一 or 武一) is a masculine Japanese given name. Notable people with the name include:

 (1899–1978), Japanese tennis player
 (1902 – c. 1945), Japanese equestrian and Imperial Japanese Army officer

Takeichi (written: 竹市) is also a Japanese surname. Notable people with the surname include:

 (born 1943), Japanese developmental biologist

Japanese-language surnames
Japanese masculine given names